Pajaree Anannarukarn (born 30 May 1999) is a Thai professional golfer who has played on the LPGA Tour since 2019. She won her first LPGA event at the 2021 ISPS Handa World Invitational.

Professional career
Anannarukarn turned professional in 2017 and joined LPGA Tour in 2019. On 1 August 2021, she won her first LPGA Tour event at the 2021 ISPS Handa World Invitational in Northern Ireland. She made a 9-foot par putt on a second extra hole to win a playoff against Emma Talley and became the fifth Thai player to win on LPGA Tour, joining Ariya Jutanugarn, Moriya Jutanugarn, Thidapa Suwannapura, and Patty Tavatanakit.

Amateur wins
2013 TGA-CAT Junior Ranking # 5
2014 TGA-SINGHA Junior Ranking # 5, TGA-SINGHA Junior Championship Q For Asia Pacific
2015 St. Francisville Area Foundation Junior at The Bluffs, Lockton Kansas City Junior, David Toms Foundation Shreveport Junior
2016 Santi Cup

Source:

Professional wins (7)

LPGA Tour wins (1)

^ Co-sanctioned by the Ladies European Tour

LPGA Tour playoff record (1–0)

Thai LPGA Tour wins (4) 
 2014 (1) 4th Singha-SAT Thai LPGA Championship^
 2016 (2) 2nd Singha-SAT Thai LPGA Championship^, 5th Singha-SAT Thai LPGA Championship^
 2017 (1) 1st Singha-SAT-Toyata Thai LPGA Championship^
^ Pajaree won the event as an amateur.

All Thailand Golf Tour wins (2)
2016 Singha E-San Open^
2017 Singha Masters^
^ Pajaree won the event as an amateur.

Results in LPGA majors
Results not in chronological order in 2020.

CUT = missed the half-way cut
NT = no tournament
"T" = tied

Summary

Most consecutive cuts made – 8 (2021 ANA – 2022 WPGA)
Longest streak of top-10s – 1 (2021 Evian)

LPGA Tour career summary

^ Official as of 2022 season
* Includes matchplay and other tournaments without a cut.

World ranking 
Position in Women's World Golf Rankings at the end of each calendar year.

Team appearances
Espirito Santo Trophy (representing Thailand): 2014, 2016

Source:

References

External links

Pajaree Anannarukarn
LPGA Tour golfers
Pajaree Anannarukarn
Southeast Asian Games medalists in golf
Pajaree Anannarukarn
1999 births
Living people
Pajaree Anannarukarn